Hortor is a Mexican extreme unblack metal band originated in Mexico City, Mexico in March 2004. The band's name translated in English means "Animate". Members have been involved in multiple projects including Freddy Acosta for his solo project, Impaled Baphomet. On one of their full-length albums, they covered a song by one of their unblack metal influences, Horde. The band has released four studio albums, an EP, a split album, a compilation album, and a demo.

Members

Current
 Freddy "Varme" Acosta – guitars (2003–present)
 "Azmaveth" – vocals, guitar (2003–present)
 Christian "Azgad" Razo – guitars, bass guitar (2003–2007, 2017–present)
 "Askenaz" – drums, vocals (2003–2007, 2017–present)
 "Hefzi-ba" – keyboards (2003–2007, 2017–present)

Former
 Izhar – drums (2007–2013)
 Nokturnal Wolf – drums, (2013–2017) bass guitar (2007–2013)
 Absalon – guitars (2007–2013)
 Arfaxad – guitars
 Adunamy – vocals (2006–2007, 2013)

Discography
Demo
 Demo (2004)

EPs
 By the Sword of the Almighty Emperor (2007)

Splits
 Satanas Destronado / Hortor (2008; split w/ Behead Demons)

Studio albums
 Decapitación absoluta al falso profeta (2007)
 Ancient Satanic Rituals Are Crushed in Dust (2009)
 Dios de dioses (2013)
 Dharma Esencia de Impureza (2017)

Compilations
 Enthroned XI (2015)

References

Musical groups established in 2004
Musical groups from Mexico City